Polish Club are an Australian garage rock duo from Sydney, New South Wales formed in 2014. The band consists of vocalist and guitarist David Novak and drummer John-Henry Pajak. The band sometimes performs with bassist Wade Keighran, who acts as their producer.

Their debut album, Alright Already (2017), received an ARIA Award nomination for Best Rock Album in 2017.

Band members
Current members
 David Novak – lead vocals, guitar (2014–present)
 John-Henry Pajak – drums, percussion, backing vocals (2014–present)

Current touring musicians
 Wade Keighran – bass, backing vocals (2018–2019, 2022–present), MPC, percussion (2018–2019)
 Dan Cunningham – guitar (2022–present), bass (2020–2022), backing vocals (2020–present)

Former touring musicians
 Dan Hogan – bass, backing vocals (2019)
 Kirsty Tickle – keyboards, saxophone, percussion, backing vocals (2020–2022)

Discography

Studio albums

Live albums

EPs

Singles

APRA Awards
The APRA Awards are held in Australia and New Zealand by the Australasian Performing Right Association to recognise songwriting skills, sales, and airplay performance by its members annually. Polish Club have been nominated for one award.

! 
|-
! scope="row"| 2020
| "Clarity"
| Most Performed Rock Work of the Year
| 
| 
|}

References

External links
 

2014 establishments in Australia
Australian rock music groups